Jeunesse Sportive Soualem known as Chabab Riadi Salmi, is a Moroccan football club currently playing in the Botola Pro. The club is located in the town of Soualem. The club finished in second place in the Botola 2 in the 2020–21 season, which led to the promotion to the first division for the first time in its history.

Season 2021/2022 
Jeunesse Sportive Soualem started its first season on first division with 2 wins against AS FAR (3-0) and MAS (3-0).

References 

Football clubs in Morocco
Sports clubs in Morocco
Association football clubs established in 1984
1984 establishments in Morocco
Berrechid Province